Eileen Louise Soper (née Service, 14 December 1900 – 24 October 1989) was a New Zealand journalist, writer and Girl Guide Commissioner. She was born in Sydney, New South Wales, Australia, in 1900.

As an adult, she was active in the cultural life of Dunedin. She worked as an editor of the Otago Daily Times under her maiden name, Eileen Service. She became an associate editor for the Otago Witness, where she wrote for the children's pages as Dot of 'Dot's Little Folk' until 1932. She married a chemistry professor from the University of Otago, Frederick George Soper, in 1938, with whom she traveled extensively overseas. After 1946, she dedicated herself to writing.

References

1900 births
1989 deaths
Australian emigrants to New Zealand
New Zealand women journalists
Writers from Dunedin
20th-century New Zealand women writers
20th-century New Zealand journalists
20th-century New Zealand writers